Píšť may refer to places in the Czech Republic:

Píšť (Opava District), a municipality and village in the Moravian-Silesian Region
Píšť (Pelhřimov District), a municipality and village in the Vysočina Region